Bartlett's Childers (originally known as Young Childers or Bleeding Childers; foaled 1716) was an important Thoroughbred sire in the 18th century.

Background
Bartlett's Childers was foaled in 1716. Bred by Leonard Childers, he was a son of the Darley Arabian and Betty Leedes. He was a full-brother to the undefeated Flying Childers, but was never trained to race. It was once thought that Betty Leedes only produced Flying Childers and a foal that died young, but it is now strongly believed that she did produce another foal by the Darley Arabian (Bartlett's Childers). He was known as "Bleeding Childers" as he frequently bled from his nose.  He was sold by Mr Bartlett of Nuttle Court, near Masham, Yorkshire.

Stud career 

Bartlett's Childers stood in Masham, Yorkshire.
Through his success as a stallion he showed breeders that unraced horses were capable of siring top racehorses.
He became champion sire in 1742. His progeny included Smales's Childers, Grey Childers, Squirt, Coughing Polly and Hartley's Little Mare. Squirt was the sire of Marske and Syphon. Hartley's Little mare was the dam of a number of top horses including Blank (who also became a champion sire) and Shakespear. Marske sired the undefeated racehorse Eclipse. Through Eclipse, his is the dominant sire line of thoroughbreds in modern times.

Pedigree

* Bartlett's Childers was inbred 3x4 to Spanker. This means that the stallion appears once in the third generation and once in the fourth generation of the pedigree. He was also 4x4 inbred to Old Morocco Mare.

Note: b. = Bay, blk. = Black

References

1716 racehorse births
British Champion Thoroughbred Sires
Racehorses bred in the Kingdom of Great Britain
Racehorses trained in the Kingdom of Great Britain
Thoroughbred family 6-a